The 1954 Coupe de France Final was a football match held at Stade Olympique Yves-du-Manoir, Colombes on May 23, 1954, that saw OGC Nice defeat Olympique de Marseille 2–1 thanks to goals by Victor Nuremberg and Luis Carniglia.

Match details

See also
1953–54 Coupe de France

External links
Coupe de France results at Rec.Sport.Soccer Statistics Foundation
Report on French federation site

Coupe
1954
Coupe De France Final 1954
Coupe De France Final 1954
Sport in Hauts-de-Seine
Coupe de France Final
Coupe de France Final